A list of notable Polish politicians and members of the defunct Polish United Workers' Party.

A
 Jerzy Adamski
 Norbert Aleksiewicz

B
 Marek Borowski

C
 Bronisław Cieślak
 Włodzimierz Cimoszewicz

K
 Marian Konieczny
 Leszek Kołakowski
 Leon Kruczkowski
 Aleksander Kwaśniewski

L
 Stanisław Leszczycki

N
 Tomasz Nałęcz

R
 Dariusz Rosati

S
 Zbigniew Siemiątkowski
 Marek Siwiec

T
 Jerzy Trela

U
 Jerzy Urban

W
 Mieczysław Wilczek